Clodomiro Almeyda Medina (February 11, 1923 – August 25, 1997) was a Chilean politician. A leading member of the Socialist Party, served as Minister of Foreign Affairs of Chile from 1970 to 1973 during the Presidency of Salvador Allende.

Biography 
He did his first studies at the German and Application High Schools of Santiago, and then studied at the Faculty of Law, University of Chile. He graduated in 1948 with a thesis entitled "Towards a Marxist theory of the State". He later became a professor of political science in the domain of his studies, especially in the School of Sociology.

He joined the Socialist Party of Chile in 1941, participating in the Popular Socialist Party during the internal bankruptcy in the first part of the 1950s. During the second government of Carlos Ibáñez del Campo he was head of the Ministries of Labor and Mining, standing out in his first ministry for being a promoter for the Single Central of Workers (CUT). With the reunification of the party in 1957, he rejoined the organization and was elected for Chamber of deputies for the period of 1961–1965.

With the victory of Salvador Allende in the 1970 Chilean presidential elections, Almeyda was appointed to the post of the Ministry of Foreign Affairs.  During the Popular Unity government, he remained in office, except for a brief period in which he served as Minister of National Defense. This was when he made a "castling" with Orlando Letelier (then Minister of the Interior), in order to avoid being the object of censorship by National Congress by means of a motion of no confidence.

After the coup d'état of September 11, 1973, which overthrew the constitutional government, he was arrested and transferred along with 99 other leaders and leaders of the Popular Unity to the Dawson Island Concentration Camp, where he was tortured and he remained under arrest for a long time. He was eventually exiled, living in the German Democratic Republic and Mexico. where he worked as a university teacher and leader of the political opposition in exile.

In a daring maneuver, he clandestinely returned to Chile in March 1987, crossing the Andes on the back of a mule. He later appeared publicly to the surprise of the authorities of the Pinochet government. This led to him being imprisoned and being the only person declared "unconstitutional" by the Constitutional Court of Chile, in use of the missing article 8 of the Constitution of Chile.

This article outlawed political parties and individuals that propagated doctrines of the left (that is, those that promoted a doctrine "founded on the class struggle"). Such conviction mainly meant the loss of the exercise of their citizenship rights and he could only be rehabilitated as a citizen once the country had returned to democratic normality, by the same court that sentenced it.

During the aftermath of the Pinochet dictatorship and during the first years of the so-called "Chilean transition to democracy" Almeyda led the leftist faction of Chilean socialism, with the renewed wing led by the leader Ricardo Núñez. In this role, "Don Cloro" (as he was popularly known), tried to establish contacts with the communists or even further to the left, through formations such as Izquierda Unida or the short-lived Broad Party of Socialist Left. During the government of Patricio Aylwin he was in charge of reopening the Chilean embassy in the Soviet Union during the last months of the Eastern Bloc. During his stay in Moscow in 1991, he accepted as "guest" former East German President Erich Honecker, who was wanted by the German authorities to be tried for crimes during the socialist regime. Despite Chile's objections, President of Russia Boris Yeltsin ordered his deportation to Berlin, in what turned into a serious diplomatic incident.

Back in Chile he devoted himself to private life, writing his memories and working as an academic at the University of Chile, School of Sociology until his death on August 25, 1997.

Tributes 
In homage to Almeyda, the "Extraordinary Congress" of the Socialist Party of Chile in May 1998 as well as its library was named after him.

References

1923 births
1997 deaths
Members of the Chamber of Deputies of Chile
Chilean diplomats
Chilean political writers
Presidency of Salvador Allende
Ambassadors of Chile to Russia
Socialist Party of Chile politicians
Foreign ministers of Chile
Labour ministers of Chile
Chilean Ministers of Mining
Chilean Ministers of Defense
Chilean people of Arab descent
Chilean Marxists